The Clié PEG-TG50 is a Personal Digital Assistant (PDA) which was manufactured by Sony, released in March 2003. Running the Palm operating system (version 5.0), the TG50 was notable as it featured a built-in backlit mini qwerty keyboard, in lieu of a dedicated handwriting recognition area as was the trend on most other PDAs.

This handheld featured a 320x320 colour LCD, bluetooth, and additional multimedia features, including MP3 and ATRAC3 audio playback, a voice-recorder, and a slot for MemoryStick PRO memory cards. The TG50 was powered by a 200 MHz Intel XScale PXA250 processor, with 16MB of RAM, 11MB of which was available for user data storage. The TG50 also featured the "Jog Dial" scroll wheel on the side of the device, as was common on Sony Clie models, and came with a flip cover to protect the front face of the device when not in use.

Specifications

Palm OS: 5.0
CPU: Intel XScale PXA250 200 MHz
Audio codec: AK4534VN
PMIC: Panasonic AN32502A
Touch controller: Analog Devices AD7873
Gate array / IO expander: NEC 65943-L63
Memory: 16MB RAM (11MB avail.), 16MB ROM
Display: 320x 320 transflective back-lit TFT-LCD, 16bit Colour (65k colours)
Sound: Internal audio amplifier, Rear speaker, Mono Mic, Stereo Headphone out.
External Connectors: USB
Expansion: Memory Stick Pro, MSIO
Wireless: Infrared IrDA, Bluetooth
Battery: Rechargeable Li-Ion Polymer (900mAh)
Size & Weight: 5.0" x 2.8" x 0.63"; 6.2 oz.
Color: Silver

See also 
Sony CLIÉ TH Series - The successor to the TG series.

External links
 TG50 Review at Palm Info Center
 TG50 Review at CNet
 TG50 Review at BrightHand
 TG50 review at PCMag

References

Sony CLIÉ